Stansstad railway station is a Swiss railway station in the municipality of Stansstad in the canton of Nidwalden. It is on the Luzern–Stans–Engelberg line, owned by the Zentralbahn railway company, and is adjacent to the bridge that carries the line across the Alpnachersee arm of Lake Lucerne and into the Lopper II tunnel.

The current railway station is the second to exist in Stansstad, having been built as a through station on the section of line opened in 1964 to connect the then Stansstad–Engelberg line to the Brünig line at Hergiswil. The original station building still exists, now devoid of rails but still used by lake shipping. The old and new routes converge on the Stans side of Stansstad, but little trace is left of the old route.

Services 
The following services stop at Stansstad:

 Lucerne S-Bahn:
 : rush-hour service between Lucerne and Stans.

The station is also served by post bus services, including services to Bürgenstock, Stans and Büren. The old station, albeit  walk away, is served by the Lake Lucerne shipping services of the Schifffahrtsgesellschaft des Vierwaldstättersees (SGV), providing an alternative connection to Lucerne and other lakeside communities.

References

External links 
 

Railway stations in the canton of Nidwalden
Zentralbahn stations